Michael English (24 December 1930 – 16 July 2019) was a British Labour Party politician.

Early life
English was educated at King George V Grammar School, Southport and Liverpool University. He was a councillor on Rochdale Borough Council 1953–65.

Parliamentary career
English contested Shipley in 1959. He was Member of Parliament for Nottingham West from 1964 to 1983, when the seat was abolished by boundary changes. Following his retirement from Parliament, he served as a councillor in the London Borough of Lambeth. He was an opponent of Britain's membership of the EEC.

He was subsequently Chairman of the London Local Involvement Network.

English was interviewed in 2012 as part of The History of Parliament's oral history project.

Subsequent
He was later active in the National Association of LINks Members, the Healthwatch network, Community Health Councils and Public and Patient Involvement Forums. He was a leading figure in the Patients' Forum for the London Ambulance Service.

Personal life
He married Carol Christine Owen on 11 September 1976 at Burton Coggles in south Lincolnshire. They had a daughter, born in 1978, and a son, born in 1980. They met in 1969 in Chelsea, London, where they both lived. In 1978 they moved to the London Borough of Lambeth. English died in July 2019 at the age of 88.

Notes

References
Times Guide to the House of Commons, 1966 and 1979

External links 
 
 
 Peter Fry interview at History of Parliament Online

1930 births
2019 deaths
Labour Party (UK) MPs for English constituencies
Councillors in Greater Manchester
Councillors in the London Borough of Lambeth
GMB (trade union)-sponsored MPs
People educated at King George V College
UK MPs 1964–1966
UK MPs 1966–1970
UK MPs 1970–1974
UK MPs 1974
UK MPs 1974–1979
UK MPs 1979–1983
Labour Party (UK) councillors